Xavier Malisse defeated Jiří Novák 7–6(8–6), 6–2 to win the 2005 Millennium International Tennis Championships singles event. Ricardo Mello was the defending champion.

Seeds

  Vincent Spadea (semifinals)
  Jiří Novák (final)
  Xavier Malisse (champion)
  Cyril Saulnier (first round)
  Ricardo Mello (second round)
  Irakli Labadze (withdrew)
  Kenneth Carlsen (quarterfinals)
  Kevin Kim (quarterfinals)

Draw

Finals

Top half

Bottom half

External links
 Main Draw
 Qualifying Draw
 ATP – 2005 Millennium Tennis Championships Singles draw
 ATP – 2005 Millennium Tennis Championships Qualifying draw

Millennium Tennis Championships
2005 Millennium International Tennis Championships
Delray Beach Open